Mamta is a 1966 Indian drama film directed by Asit Sen, written by Nihar Ranjan Gupta and Krishan Chander, and with music composed by Roshan and written by Majrooh Sultanpuri. The movie stars Suchitra Sen, Ashok Kumar and Dharmendra. The film about middle class fears and class conflict, has lead actress Suchitra Sen in a double role.

The film is also noted for its music by Roshan and lyrics by Majrooh Sultanpuri, in songs like, Rahen Na Rahen Hum sung by Lata Mangeshkar and her hit duet, Chuppa Lo Yun Dil Mein Pyar Mera with Hemant Kumar.

The film was a remake of Asit Sen's own Bengali film, Uttar Falguni (1963), also starring Suchitra Sen.

Plot
Monish Rai (Ashok Kumar) comes from a wealthy family and is in love with Devayani (Suchitra Sen), who is from a poor family. Monish wants to travel abroad for higher studies, and this will be funded by his family. He fears that his family will not approve of Devayani and will refuse to fund his foreign studies if he makes known his intention to marry her. Therefore, he and Devayani agree to delay their wedding until Monish returns to India.

Financial problem overwhelm Devayani's father not long after Monish leaves for England. He has been taking new loans to repay old loans, and most of these new loans have come from a certain Rakhal, who poses as a friend and well-wisher of Devayani's father. Rakhal is in fact a vile and dissolute man, and he has his eye on the beautiful Devayani. At a timely moment, Rakhal makes his irresistible proposal to Devayani's father. A simple and rather gullible man, Devayani's father thinks that marrying Rakhal would be a good thing for Devayani because Rakhal is a rich man and Devayani will live a comfortable life. He agrees to give his daughter in marriage to Rakhal. A horrified Devayani tells her father that she does not want to marry at all, but to live with him and take care of him in his old age. This cuts no ice at all with the father, and the wedding date is fixed. A desperate Devayani even approaches Monish's mother for financial assistance, but is refused.

The wedding takes place. Rakhal, who is significantly older than Devayani, makes some effort to court her, but she finds him repulsive. Rakhal soon begins to find Devayani's sour and rejectionist attitude tiresome, and he returns to his drinking and gambling cronies. He also resorts to violence when he feels insulted by Devayani's attitude. Rakhal had inherited much wealth from his father, but he is a wastrel with a fondness for drink, cards and dancing girls. He splurges money on his many bad habits and the truth is that much of his money is now gone. Devayani soon becomes pregnant and gives birth to a baby girl, Suparna. Devayani's father dies just around this time, leaving her with nowhere to turn to for succour. Her husband is briefly put in jail after a drunken brawl at a brothel, and it becomes known that his money is finished. Unhappy with her marriage and her circumstances, Devayani runs away and becomes a devadasi, or temple dancer, performing for a male clientele. She is however tracked down by Rakhal, who attempts to kidnap his daughter Suparna on more than one occasion. In order to ensure separation of father and daughter, Devayani leaves Suparna in an orphanage run by Christian missionaries, making the stipulation that Suparna should not be placed for adoption, and that she will contribute for Suparna's upkeep when possible. Devayani relocates and throws herself wholeheartedly into the project of earning a living by singing and dancing for a male audience at a traditional-style brothel (song and dance performances to a male audience, with few if any instances of sex work).

Monish returns to the city after completing his education. He has already heard of Devayani's wedding. He is unable to forget her, and he remains unmarried all his life. Once, on the street, he sees a woman who looks like Devayani and calls out to her, but she turns away and quickly sits inside a nearby taxi with no sign of recognition and drives away. Monish is told by others that the person he has seen is a Lucknow-based prostitute, Pannabai.

Is Devayani still alive? Who is Pannabai? What happened to Suparna?

The movie relates the story of Devayani's life and revolves around the theme of "mamta" - motherhood, or a mother's love, what a mother does for the protection and well-being of her child, and all the sacrifices made by her in order that her child can live a life filled with status, dignity and love .
 
Veteran actress (Suchitra Sen) portrays the double role both of Devayani and Suparna.

Cast
 Dharmendra ... Barrister Indraneel
 Suchitra Sen ... Devyani - Pannabai / Suparna
 Ashok Kumar ... Monish Rai
 Bipin Gupta ... Kantilal
 David Abraham ... Doctor Abraham
 Tarun Bose ... Mahadev Prasad
 Pahari Sanyal ...	Prosecuting Lawyer
 Pratima Devi ... Mother Mary
 Kalipada Chakraborty ... Rakhal Bhattacharya
 Chhaya Devi ... Minabai
 Rajlakshmi Devi ... Guest at party
 Chaman Puri ... Ghishta Babu - Devyani's dad (uncredited)
 Asit Sen (director) as Mahadev Prasad
 Jahor Roy

Box office
The film performed well at the domestic Indian box office. It was year's 15th highest-grossing film in India, earning . This was equivalent to estimated footfalls of approximately  tickets sold in India.

The film became an overseas blockbuster in the Soviet Union, selling  tickets in 1969, making it the sixth highest-grossing Indian film ever in the Soviet Union. This was equivalent to an estimated  Rbls (or ).

Combined, the film grossed an estimated  worldwide. In terms of footfalls, the film sold an estimated  tickets worldwide.

Nominations
 Filmfare Nomination for Best Film
 Filmfare Nomination for Best Director - Asit Sen
 Filmfare Nomination for Best Actress - Suchitra Sen
 Filmfare Nomination for Best Story - Nihar Ranjan Gupta

Music
The songs of the films were composed by Roshan and written by Majrooh Sultanpuri.

Notes

References

External links
 

1966 films
1960s Hindi-language films
Films about women in India
Hindi remakes of Bengali films
Films scored by Roshan
1960s Urdu-language films
Films based on works by Nihar Ranjan Gupta
Urdu-language Indian films